Ultimate Run–D.M.C. is a 2003 compilation album by Run–D.M.C.  It contains 18 tracks as well as a bonus DVD with 14 music videos.

Track listing
 "Rock Box" – 5:32
 "Run's House" – 3:45
 "Walk This Way" (feat. Aerosmith) - 5:11
 "Together Forever (Krush Groove 4)" (live at Hollis Park 1984) – 3:34
 "King of Rock" – 5:14
 "Jam-Master Jay" – 3:12
 "Hit It Run" – 3:11
 "It's Tricky" – 3:04
 "Peter Piper" – 3:23
 "It's Like That" – 4:51
 "Raising Hell" – 5:33
 "My Adidas" – 2:49
 "Sucker M.C.'s (Krush Groove 1)" – 3:11
 "Mary, Mary" – 3:14
 "Here We Go" (Live at the Fun House) – 4:06
 "Beats to the Rhyme" – 2:42
 "Down with the King" – 5:04
 "It's Like That" (Run-DMC vs. Jason Nevins) – 4:08

+ bonus DVD including 14 videos

References

Run-DMC albums
2003 compilation albums
Arista Records compilation albums